Zambia competed at the 2014 Summer Youth Olympics, in Nanjing, China from 16 August to 28 August 2014.

Athletics

Zambia qualified four athletes.

Qualification Legend: Q=Final A (medal); qB=Final B (non-medal); qC=Final C (non-medal); qD=Final D (non-medal); qE=Final E (non-medal)

Boys
Track & road events

Girls
Track & road events

Field Hockey

Zambia qualified a boys' and girls' team based on its performance at the African Qualification Tournament.

Boys' Tournament

Roster

 Lombe Bwalya
 Shadrick Katele
 Blessing Lowole
 Richard Lungu
 Alfred Mpande
 Victor Mwansa
 Brighton Siwale
 Samuel Tagwireyi
 Samson Tembo

Group Stage

Quarterfinals

Crossover

Seventh and eighth place

Girls' Tournament

Roster

 Catherine Kalomo
 Eniless Mambwe
 Loveness Mudenda
 Angel Muswema
 Esther Mwale
 Tionge Mwale
 Carol Nakombe
 Martha Nankala
 Comfort Phiri

Group Stage

Ninth and tenth place

Judo

Zambia was given a quota to compete by the tripartite committee.

Individual

Team

Swimming

Zambia qualified one swimmer.

Boys

References

2014 in Zambian sport
Nations at the 2014 Summer Youth Olympics
Zambia at the Youth Olympics